Kacchi was a division of the former princely state of Kalat in Baluchistan, Pakistan, with an area . It was located in the Kacchi Plain.

History
The history of Kacchi is closely connected with the history of Sindh. In the 15th century the Baloch arrived and there were constant wars between their leaders Mir Chakar Rind and Mir Gwahram Khan Lashari. Then the country was taken over by the Arghuns, following which it came under the control of the Mughal Empire. In 1740, Nadir Shah handed it over to the Khanate of Kalat.

After the Independence of Pakistan, Kalat State became part of Pakistan and Kachhi District was notified as a district in February 1965.

See also 
 Baluchistan Agency
 History of Balochistan

References

Sibi District

Khanate of Kalat
Sibi District